Bates is an unincorporated community in Grant County, Oregon, United States.  it has a post office with a ZIP code 97817.

Bates was a lumber mill town until 1975 with a population of up to 400.  Bates State Park opened in 2011.

Climate
This climatic region is typified by large seasonal temperature differences, with warm to hot (and often humid) summers and cold (sometimes severely cold) winters.  According to the Köppen Climate Classification system, Bates has a humid continental climate, abbreviated "Dfb" on climate maps.

References

External links
 History of Bates at Oregon Encyclopedia

Company towns in Oregon
Unincorporated communities in Grant County, Oregon
Unincorporated communities in Oregon